In geometry, the pentakis icosidodecahedron or subdivided icosahedron is a convex polyhedron with 80 triangular faces, 120 edges, and 42 vertices. It is a dual of the truncated rhombic triacontahedron (chamfered dodecahedron).

Construction
Its name comes from a topological construction from the icosidodecahedron with the kis operator applied to the pentagonal faces. In this construction, all the vertices are assumed to be the same distance from the center, while in general icosahedral symmetry can be maintained even with the 12 order-5 vertices at a different distance from the center as the other 30.

It can also be topologically constructed from the icosahedron, dividing each triangular face into 4 triangles by adding mid-edge vertices. From this construction, all 80 triangles will be equilateral, but faces will be coplanar.

Related polyhedra

Related polytopes 
It represents the exterior envelope of a vertex-centered orthogonal projection of the 600-cell, one of six convex regular 4-polytopes, into 3 dimensions.

See also 
 Tetrakis cuboctahedron

References 
 George W. Hart, Sculpture based on Propellorized Polyhedra, Proceedings of MOSAIC 2000, Seattle, WA, August, 2000, pp. 61–70 
 John H. Conway, Heidi Burgiel, Chaim Goodman-Strass, The Symmetries of Things 2008, 
 Chapter 21: Naming the Archimedean and Catalan polyhedra and Tilings (p 284)
  Dover 1999

External links 
 VTML polyhedral generator Try "k5aD" (Conway polyhedron notation)

Geodesic polyhedra